The Houston Forward Times (FT) is a weekly newspaper headquartered in Houston, Texas. It is one of the largest black-owned newspapers in the city. It is published by the Forward Times Publishing Company, which also publishes other publications such as the Daily Cougar. As of 2014, the FT is one of the few remaining self-printing black newspapers.

Julius Carter started the newspaper, which opened in 1960:

Carter died in 1971 and his wife, Lenora Carter, took over the operations of the newspaper. The Forward Times Publishing Company began publishing it in 1977. She continued to publish and edit the newspaper, and was continuing to do so in the 1990s.

The circulation was 17,970 in the 1990s.

Lenora Carter died on April 10, 2010. Karen Carter Richards, daughter of Julius and Lenora Carter, continues as the CEO and Publisher of the Forward Times. In September 2010 the Julius and Lenora Carter Scholarship and Youth Foundation was established, which publicly benefits low- and/or medium-income graduating seniors and college students of private and public schools within the Greater Houston Metropolitan area, and also interns students through the Forward Times Publishing Company.

On October 2, 2015, the Forward Times celebrated 55 years of being in print, "reporting the truth, and giving back to the community"  with a cover feature and a benefit concert, with the proceeds going to the Julius and Lenora Carter Scholarship and Youth Foundation.

See also
 African-American News and Issues
 Houston Defender
 History of African Americans in Houston

References

External links

 Houston Forward Times

African-American history in Houston
African-American newspapers
Newspapers published in Houston
1960 establishments in Texas
Newspapers established in 1960
Weekly newspapers published in Texas